The 2020 Galway Senior Hurling Championship. was the 123rd staging of the Galway Senior Hurling Championship since its establishment in 1887. It was won by St. Thomas' for the third consecutive year and the fifth time in total.		
Kinvara participated in the senior championship having been promoted from the intermediate competition in 2019 but were subsequently relegated. The competition was sponsored by Brooks for 3 years starting in 2020.

Competition format

Due to the COVID-19 pandemic in Ireland the initial draw was scrapped, the format was changed and the groupings redrawn on 29 June 2020. 

Twenty four teams compete in the initial group stages of the championship – the top ranked twelve teams compete in the Senior A Group and the second ranked twelve teams compete in the Senior B Group. Eight teams from the Senior A Group and four teams from the Senior B Group progress to the knockout stage. The competition format is explained further in each of the championship rounds in the sections below.

Group stage

Senior A
Senior A consists of 12 teams divided into three groups of 4 teams. The top teams from each group plus one drawn second team qualify for the quarter finals. The remaining 2 second placed teams play in the preliminary quarter finals. The bottom team from each group will be relegated to playing in the following year's Senior B Section.

Senior A - Group 1
{| class="wikitable" 
!width=20|
!  style="width:150px; text-align:left;"|Team
!width=20|
!width=20|
!width=20|
!width=20|
!width=50|
!width=50|
!width=20|
!width=20|
|- style="background:#98FB98;"
|1||align=left| Cappataggle                  ||3||2||0||1||5-43||3-42||7||4
|- style="background:#98FB98;"
|2||align=left| Loughrea                        ||3||2||0||1||4-47||4-42||5||4
|-
|3||align=left| Tommy Larkin's            ||3||2||0||1||2-39||0-40||5||4
|- style="background:#FFBBBB;"
|4||align=left| Tynagh/Abbey-Duniry  ||3||0||0||2||4-38||8-43||-17||0
|}
 Loughrea were drawn from the second placed teams to go straight into the quarter finals

Senior A - Group 2
{| class="wikitable" 
!width=20|
!  style="width:150px; text-align:left;"|Team
!width=20|
!width=20|
!width=20|
!width=20|
!width=40|
!width=35|
!width=20|
!width=20|
|- style="background:#98FB98;"
|1|| style="text-align:left;"| Turloughmore  ||3||2||0||0||2-54||1-49||8||4
|- style="background:#ccf;"
|2|| style="text-align:left;"| Liam Mellows           ||3||2||0||1||5-44||1-47||9||4
|- 
|3|| style="text-align:left;"| Oranmore-Maree       ||3||1||0||2||1-45||3-53||-14||2
|- style="background:#FFBBBB;"
|4|| style="text-align:left;"| Clarinbridge           ||3||1||0||2||0-55||3-49||-3||2
|}

Senior A - Group 3
{| class="wikitable" 
!width=20|
!  style="width:150px; text-align:left;"|Team
!width=20|
!width=20|
!width=20|
!width=20|
!width=40|
!width=35|
!width=20|
!width=20|
|- style="background:#98FB98;"
|1|| style="text-align:left;"| St. Thomas'                ||3||3||0||0||6-83||4-51||38||6
|- style="background:#ccf;"
|2|| style="text-align:left;"| Sarsfields  ||3||1||0||1||8-51||0-59||16||4
|-
|3|| style="text-align:left;"| Castlegar                    ||3||1||0||1||7-58||6-52||9||2
|- style="background:#FFBBBB;"
|4|| style="text-align:left;"| Portumna                      ||3||0||0||2||1-51||12-81||-63||0
|}

Senior B
Senior B consists of 12 teams divided into three groups of 4. The top two teams in each group qualify for the 2020 preliminary quarter finals and compete in the following year's Senior A competition. The bottom placed teams in each group enter the relegation playoffs.

Senior B - Group 1

{| class="wikitable" 
!width=20|
!  style="width:150px; text-align:left;"|Team
!width=20|
!width=20|
!width=20|
!width=20|
!width=40|
!width=45|
!width=20|
!width=20|
|- style="background:#ccf;"
|1|| style="text-align:left;"| Craughwell        ||3||2||1||0||7-63||7-38||25||5
|- style="background:#ccf;"
|2|| style="text-align:left;"| Gort                    ||3||2||1||0||4-55||0-42||25||5
|-
|3|| style="text-align:left;"| Ballinderreen  ||3||1||0||2||6-37||6-56||-19||2
|- style="background:#FFBBBB;"
|4|| style="text-align:left;"| Kinvara              ||3||0||0||3||4-39||8-58||-31||0
|}
 Craughwell top the group on "Scores for"

Senior B - Group 2

{| class="wikitable" 
!width=20|
!  style="width:150px; text-align:left;"|Team
!width=20|
!width=20|
!width=20|
!width=20|
!width=30|
!width=40|
!width=20|
!width=20|
|- style="background:#ccf;"
|1||align=left| Killimordaly  ||3||2||0||1||5-51||2-46||14||4
|- style="background:#ccf;"
|2||align=left| Ardrahan          ||3||2||0||1||5-34||1-44||2||4
|-
|3||align=left| Athenry           ||3||1||1||1||1-57||5-47||-2||3
|- style="background:#FFBBBB;"
|4||align=left| Beagh               ||3||0||1||2||0-42||3-47||-14||1
|}

Senior B - Group 3

{| class="wikitable" 
!width=20|
!  style="width:150px; text-align:left;"|Team
!width=20|
!width=20|
!width=20|
!width=20|
!width=30|
!width=40|
!width=20|
!width=20|
|- style="background:#ccf;"
|1||align=left| Ahascragh-Fohenagh  ||3||3||0||0||6-54||3-51||12||6
|- style="background:#ccf;"
|2||align=left| Mullagh                        ||3||2||0||1||3-54||4-44||7||4
|-
|3||align=left| Padraig Pearses       ||3||1||0||2||4-40||2-52||-6||2
|- style="background:#FFBBBB;"
|4||align=left| Kilnadeema-Leitrim  ||3||0||0||3||2-52||6-53||-13||0
|}

Senior Relegation
{| class="wikitable" 
!width=20|
!  style="width:150px; text-align:left;"|Team
!width=20|
!width=20|
!width=20|
!width=20|
!width=50|
!width=50|
!width=20|
!width=20|
|- style="background:#98FB98;"
|1||align=left| Beagh                            ||2||1||0||1||4-28||1-35||2||2
|- style="background:#FFBBBB;"
|2||align=left| Kilnadeema-Leitrim  ||2||1||0||1||1-36||2-31||2||2
|- style="background:#FFBBBB;"
|3||align=left| Kinvara                        ||2||1||0||1||2-29||4-27||-4||2
|}
 Beagh top the group on "score for"

Senior Relegation Playoff

Senior Knockout stage

Senior Preliminary Quarter-finals

Senior Quarter-finals

The three teams who finished first in the Senior A groups and one of the second placed teams (drawn at random) will play the four winners of the senior preliminary quarter finals.

Senior Semi-finals

Senior final

References

Galway Senior Hurling Championship
Galway Senior Hurling Championship
Galway Senior Hurling Championship